BBC Gardeners' World is a monthly British gardening magazine owned by Immediate Media Company, containing tips for gardening from past and current presenters of the television series Gardeners' World.

History and profile
BBC Gardeners' World was established in 1991. The magazine is part of Immediate Media Company and is published on a monthly basis. It often has offers on plants, free supplements and giveaways.  Copies are sold at newsagents and by subscription.

The circulation of BBC Gardeners' World was 237,650 copies for the first half of 2013. Its circulation dropped to 219,222 copies for the first half of 2014.

Contributors
Contributors have included:

 Monty Don
 Carol Klein

Show

A trade show and floral exhibition, Gardeners' World Live, promoted by the magazine, is held every June at the National Exhibition Centre near Birmingham. Presenters from the show usually make guest appearances.

See also 
List of horticultural magazines

References

External links
 BBC Gardeners' World magazine website

1991 establishments in the United Kingdom
BBC publications
Horticultural magazines published in the United Kingdom
Magazines established in 1991
Monthly magazines published in the United Kingdom